During the 2003–04 Italian football season, Udinese Calcio competed in the Serie A.

Kit
Udinese's kit was manufactured by French sports retailer Le Coq Sportif and sponsored by Bernardi.

Serie A

Squad

Goalkeepers
  Adriano Bonaiuti
  Morgan De Sanctis
  Olivier Renard

Defenders
  Valerio Bertotto
  Felipe Da Silva
  Per Krøldrup
  Alessandro Pierini
  Nestor Sensini

Midfielders
  Alberto
  Lucas Castroman
  Diego Gavilan
  Marek Jankulovski
  Martin Jørgensen
  Sulley Ali Muntari
  Michele Pazienza
  Mirko Pieri
  Giampiero Pinzi
  David Pizarro
  Fabio Rossitto

Attackers
  Dino Fava
  Henok Goitom
  Vincenzo Iaquinta
  Carsten Jancker
  Siyabonga Nomvethe

References

Udinese Calcio seasons
Udinese